Gail G. Hanson, born 22 February 1947 in Dayton, Ohio is an American experimental particle physicist.

Career
Hanson received her PhD from Massachusetts Institute of Technology in 1973. She spent sixteen years at SLAC, first as a research assistant and then as a permanent staff member. Whilst there, Hanson participated in the discovery of the J/psi meson and tau lepton.  Her work led to the first evidence for quark jet production in electron-positron annihilation, for which she was awarded the 1996 Panofsky Prize with Roy Schwitters.

In 2002 she was appointed Distinguished Professor of Physics at the University of California, Riverside.

Awards and honors 
 Fellow of the American Physical Society
 Fellow of the American Association for the Advancement of Science
 John Simon Guggenheim Memorial Foundation Fellow
 Winner of the W.K.H. Panofsky Prize in Experimental Particle Physics from the American Physical Society (1996)

References

External links
 
Scientific publications of Gail Hanson on INSPIRE-HEP

Particle physicists
1947 births
Living people
American women physicists
Fellows of the American Association for the Advancement of Science
Fellows of the American Physical Society
Winners of the Panofsky Prize
People associated with CERN
University of California, Riverside faculty
Massachusetts Institute of Technology alumni
Indiana University alumni
Scientists from California
21st-century American  physicists
20th-century American physicists
20th-century American women scientists
21st-century American women scientists
People from Dayton, Ohio